Haliotis discus, commonly called disk abalone or Edo abalone, is a species of abalone sea snail.

Subspecies

 Haliotis discus discus Reeve, 1846
 Haliotis discus hannai Ino, 1953 (sometimes wrongly identified as Haliotis kamtschatkana kamtschatkana Jonas, 1845, to which it is very similar)

Description
The size of the shell varies between 100 mm and 150 mm. "This species is closely allied in all characters to Haliotis kamtschatkana but is more elongated than the typical Kamtschatkana. The interior surface has a peculiarly metallic luster, light bronze-green and coppery-red predominating."

Distribution
H. discus is endemic to the waters off Japan and eastern Asia.

References

 Geiger D.L. & Owen B. (2012) Abalone: Worldwide Haliotidae. Hackenheim: Conchbooks. viii + 361 pp.

External links
 

discus
Molluscs of the Pacific Ocean
Marine gastropods
Gastropods described in 1846
Taxa named by Lovell Augustus Reeve